Tongans, a Polynesian group, represent more than 98% of the inhabitants of Tonga. The rest are European (the majority are British), mixed European, and other Pacific Islanders. There also are several hundred Chinese. Almost two-thirds of the population live on its main island, Tongatapu. Although an increasing number of Tongans have moved into the only urban and commercial center, Nukualofa, where European and indigenous cultural and living patterns have blended, village life and kinship ties continue to be important throughout the country. Everyday life is heavily influenced by Polynesian traditions and especially by the Christian faith; for example, all commerce and entertainment activities cease from midnight Saturday until midnight Sunday, and the constitution declares the Sabbath to be sacred, forever. Other important Christian denominations include Methodists (Free Wesleyan) and Roman Catholics, and the Church of Jesus Christ of Latter-day Saints.

Primary education between ages 6 and 14 is compulsory and free in state schools. Mission schools provide about 83% of the primary and 90% of the secondary level education. Higher education includes teacher training, nursing and medical training, a small private university, a women's business college, and a number of private agricultural schools. Most higher education is pursued overseas.

Based on 2006 estimates, the religious breakdown of the population was Protestant 64.9% (includes Free Wesleyan Church 37.3%, Free Church of Tonga 11.4%, Church of Tonga 7.2%, Tokaikolo Christian Church 2.6%, Assembly of God 2.3%, Seventh Day Adventist 2.2%, Constitutional Church of Tonga 0.9%, Anglican 0.8% and Full Gospel Church 0.2%), Latter-day Saints 18.6%, Roman Catholic 15.6%, other 1.1%, none 0.03%, unspecified 1.7%.

As the 1960s ended the population growth rate fell rapidly in the country.

Population history
In the 1930s Tonga had a population of about 32,000. Starting in the 1970s large scale migration began to Australia and New Zealand. By the 1970s the emigration rate from Tonga to Australia, New Zealand, United Kingdom, Canada, France and the United States was over 2% annually. The country has over 100,000 residents.

Vital statistics

Births and deaths

Diaspora

Oceania
There are over 150,000 people of Tongan descent living outside of Tonga, mostly in New Zealand, the United States, and Australia. 60,336 New Zealanders identified themselves as being of Tongan ethnicity with 22,413 stating that they were born in Tonga. As of 2016, Tongan New Zealanders make up 1.2% of New Zealand's population of approximately 5 million people. 

There is a Tongan Australian population of 32,691 people, which is over 0.1% of Australia's population. 60% of Tongan people live in New South Wales.

United States

In the U.S., Tongan Americans constitute a small 0.02% of the U.S. population, with over 57,000 people recorded having Tongan ancestry in the country as of 2010.

California
Much of the U.S. Tongan community resides in California. In San Mateo County (0.7% of the county's population) in the San Francisco Bay Area, there are over 5,000 Tongan Americans, mainly concentrated in Daly City, East Palo Alto, San Mateo, and San Bruno. There is a Tongan community in Oakland, of about 1,500 people (0.3% of Oakland's population). There is a Tongan population in Los Angeles County, mainly in Inglewood (0.7% of the city's population), Hawthorne, and Long Beach. There are also around 1,000 Tongans in Sacramento and more throughout the Sacramento Valley.

Utah
There is a sizable Tongan community in Utah, mainly in the Salt Lake Valley. Salt Lake County has over 8,000 residents of Tongan ancestry. The Glendale neighborhood of Salt Lake City has one of the highest concentrations of Tongans in the area.

Texas
Euless, Texas, in the Dallas-Fort Worth area, has a significant Tongan community, with more than 1,000 residents.

References

 
Society of Tonga